Forbidden Music (Italian: Musica proibita) is a 1942 Italian drama film directed by Carlo Campogalliani and starring Tito Gobbi, María Mercader and Giuseppe Rinaldi. An elderly composer recalls his youthful romance with a woman while a student in Florence.

It was made at the Fert Studios in Turin.

Cast
 Tito Gobbi as Paolo Marini, detto Paolo Folchi  
 María Mercader as Claretta Melzi  
 Giuseppe Rinaldi as Giulio Folchi  
 Loredana as Elena Landi 
 Mario Casaleggio as Il maestro Bignami  
 Carlo Romano as Otello  
 Enzo Morisi as Arnaldo Rovere  
 Carlo Duse as Il marchese Melzi  
 Letizia Quaranta as La marchesa Beatrice Melzi  
 Giorgio Costantini as Mario Melzi 
 Mario Siletti as Il conte Landi, padre di Elena 
 Ilena Jurick 
 Valfrido Picardi as L'impresario Salvetti  
 Lori Randi 
 Giuseppe Zago

References

Bibliography
 Bayman, Louis. The Operatic and the Everyday in Postwar Italian Film Melodrama. Edinburgh University Press, 2014.

External links

1942 films
1940s Italian-language films
Films directed by Carlo Campogalliani
Films set in Florence
Italian historical drama films
1940s historical drama films
Films set in the 1900s
Italian black-and-white films
1942 drama films
1940s Italian films